The Atashgah, also transcribed as 'Ateshgah (from , "fire temple") is an ancient Zoroastrian fire temple in Tbilisi, Georgia. It was built when Georgia was a part of Persian Empire in Sasanian era (224-651 AD). It is described as the "northernmost Zoroastrian fire-temple in the world."

Atashgah is located around 100 meters east of the Holy Mother of God Church of Bethlehem, on the Old Town slopes northeast of the Mother Georgia statue. It is an ancient brick building with a protective curved perspex roof. The temple is one of the oldest religious buildings in the Georgia's capital located in the historic part of the city.

The Atashgah has been preserved because it has been discreetly camouflaged in the city. There is little information as to when it was built, but some historians refer to it as having been built in the Sassanian era. During the wars between Persians and Turkish Muslims, Tbilisi fell into Turkish hands and the church was temporarily turned into a mosque. The site is inscribed on Georgia's list of Monuments of National Significance. In 2007, the Norwegian government joined a project to restore Atashgah.

See also
Sasanian Iberia

References

External links

 360-degree Video: Ateshgah of Tbilisi

Religious buildings and structures in Tbilisi
Fire temples in Georgia (country)
Old Tbilisi
Sasanian architecture
Immovable Cultural Monuments of National Significance of Georgia